Christian Lehmann may refer to:

Christian Lehmann, an Ore Mountain chronicler, who reported on the Thirty Years' War in Raschau
Christian Lehmann, a Major of the Reserves for Nazi Germany, who was awarded the Knight's Cross of the Iron Cross in 1944
Christian Lehmann, an executive producer of the German television series, Plonsters
Christian Lehmann, a member of the band Crimson Joy
Christian Lehmann, author of Ultimate Game, honored with an Mildred L. Batchelder Award in 2001
Christian Lehmann, a one-time president of Societas Linguistica Europaea
Christian Lehmann, a game designer whose credits include Horror on the Orient Express
, German linguist

See also
Johann Georg Christian Lehmann